In geology and mineralogy, a mineral group is a set of mineral species with essentially the same crystal structure and composed of chemically similar elements.

 
In all these minerals, the anions consist mainly of groups of four  tetrahedra connected by shared oxygen corners so as to form a double chain of fused six-member rings. In some of the species, aluminum  may replace some silicon atoms  in the backbone, with extra B or C cations to balance the charges.

List of groups

 Alunite group
 Amphibole group
 Aragonite group
 Arsenic minerals
 Blodite group
 Calcite group
 Cancrinite group
 Clay minerals group
 Descloizite group
 Dolomite group
 Epidote group
 Feldspar group
 Feldspathoid
 Garnet group
 Hematite group
 Humite group
 Ilmenite group
 Langbeinites
 Mica group
 Pyroxene group
 Rutile group
 Serpentine group
 Smectite group
 Sodalite group
 Spinel group
 Tetradymite group

See also
 Mineral
 Mineral variety

References